The Trout River is an  river in Presque Isle County, Michigan, in the United States. It flows into Lake Huron at Rogers City.

See also
List of rivers of Michigan

References

Michigan  Streamflow Data from the USGS

Rivers of Michigan
Rivers of Presque Isle County, Michigan
Tributaries of Lake Huron